Sendurai is the headquarters of the Sendurai taluk in the Ariyalur district of the Indian state of Tamil Nadu.

Sendurai may also refer to:
 Sendurai taluk, a taluk of Ariyalur district
 Sendurai Block, a revenue block of Ariyalur district